Kim Hak-song (6 July 1952 – 12 June 2022) was a South Korean politician. A member of the Grand National Party, he served in the National Assembly from 2000 to 2012. Kim died on 12 June 2022 at the age of 69.

References

1952 births
2022 deaths
21st-century South Korean politicians
South Korean businesspeople
Members of the National Assembly (South Korea)
Liberty Korea Party politicians
Konkuk University alumni
People from Changwon